Andra långgatan (Second Long Street) is a street in Gothenburg, Sweden. It starts west of Haga at Järntorget and ends at Masthuggstorget. The street is renowned for its many restaurants, bars, galleries and record shops. Although the street has a dodgy past its reputation has now been redeemed. It is now a "magnet for creative types" according to Lonely planet. The tourists have yet to find this street but alternative Gothenburgians love the street for its "authenticity". It doesn't house any major commercial corporations such as Mcdonald's or H&M but more smaller venues.

Once every year (since 2007) andra långgatan houses a street party. On this day, the shop owners and restaurants bring their products to the outside, local commerce takes place and music is filling the streets. The event is not advertised and  the date is spread through social media and word of mouth.

References 
Metcalf, Stephen. "Sweden Unzipped", The New York Times, 23 September 2007. Retrieved on 2010-09-08.
Karlsson, Caroline. "Stans själ finns på Second Longstreet", Göteborgsposten, 11 August 2010. Retrieved on 2010-09-08.
Düsing, Pär. "Fullt ös på Andra Långgatan", Göteborgsposten, 5 June 2010. Retrieved on 2010-09-08.

Streets in Gothenburg
Restaurant districts and streets